For articles on Colorimeter see:

 Colorimeter (chemistry)
 Tristimulus colorimeter

See also

 Colorimetry
 Colorimetry (chemical method)